Bedri is a Turkish given name for males. Notable people with the name include:

Bedri Baykam (born 1957), Turkish artist
Bedri Omuri (born 1957), Albanian footballer
Bedri Pejani (1885–1946), Albanian politician
Bedri Rahmi Eyüboğlu (1911–1975), Turkish painter and poet

Albanian masculine given names
Turkish masculine given names